In Old Amarillo  is a 1951 American Western film starring Roy Rogers.

Plot
Roy is sent to investigate when a greedy land owner tries to capitalize on a drought, cheating property holders like Madge Adams and her grandmother out of the property with the help of ruthless gunman Clint Burnside.

Cast
 Roy Rogers as Roy
 Estelita Rodriguez as Pepita
 Penny Edwards as Madge Adams
 Pinky Lee as Pinky
 Roy Barcroft as Clint
 William Holmes
 Roy Rogers Riders

References

External links
 

1951 films
1951 Western (genre) films
American Western (genre) films
American black-and-white films
Films directed by William Witney
1950s English-language films
1950s American films